Vallamai Tharayo is a 2008 Tamil language romantic drama film written and directed by Madhumitha. The film stars Parthiban and Chaya Singh, with Karunas and Anand Raj in supporting roles, and Srikanth in a guest appearance. The music was composed by Bharadwaj, and the film released on 28 June 2008. The story explores the situation of a girl who is forced into a marriage with a man whom she barely knows and has no intention of getting to know.

Plot
The movie opens with Nandita (Chaya Singh) and her husband Anand (Parthiban) in the process of getting a divorce. Nandita's lawyer accuses Anand of physically abusing Nandita, calling him a sadist.

A flashback takes the audience back to the circumstances of their marriage. A happy working girl from the city, Nandita returns to her home village for a family function, only to find that her father Veerasamy (Anand Raj) has decided to marry Nandita off elsewhere. Nandita, who has spent her life falling in love with Sekar (Srikanth), her cousin and original fiancé, cannot agree to this sudden marriage. However, her father forces her to agree, and the marriage to Anand takes place. The newlyweds move back to the city, and though the kind and jovial Anand attempts to lead a life with her and make her fall in love with him, Nandita does not budge. She is normally cold and impolite, except for when she sees constant reminders of Sekar.

The scene cuts back to the family court, where Nandita has gotten the divorce and calls Anand for a final farewell, telling him to find a girl whom he will truly love. Now Nandita is a free woman, living life the way she wants to and dreaming of seeing Sekar again. She moves to a new apartment, gets a new job, and a new friend - her housekeeper Savithri (Devipriya). Things are going well, but Anand is a constant unwanted presence in her life - greeting her every morning and calling her frequently. When asked why he is still around, he tells her that he likes no one else but her.

On Valentine's Day, Nandita sees Sekar on TV, talking about her as his soulmate, his first love. To her surprise, he announces that he is getting married soon because she is already married. Upset Nandita is pushed even further over the edge when she finds out that Savithri has been talking to Anand about Nandita. She leaves on a company business trip for a few days; a visit to a school for disabled children. Learning a few life lessons, Nandita comes back a changed woman and becomes open to getting to know Anand for the first time.

The end of the movie shows Nandita and Anand happily spending time with each other.

Cast
Parthiban as Anand
Chaya Singh as Nandita
Karunas as Master
Anand Raj as Veerasamy (Nandita's father)
Kuyili as Nandita's mother
Rajyalakshmi as Anand's mother
Devipriya as Savithri
Chaams as Office Manager
Srikanth as Sekar (guest appearance)

Soundtrack
Soundtrack was composed by Bharadwaj and lyrics were written by Kamakodiyan, Pa. Vijay, Snehan and Aandal Priyadarshini.

Critical reception
Sify wrote "Unfortunately Madhumita has flunked, as she has made her own version of the Mani Ratnam classic Mounaragam from a feminist point of view. The film is weak in narration and execution". Behindwoods wrote "Madhumita’s debut attempt is simply a lost ball in the high weeds and reminds us that albeit her potential she needs training in direction – especially in directing feature films." Rediff wrote "What lets the movie down is a shaky script. Heavily inspired by Mani Rathnam's Mouna Raagam, the director has obviously tried a hand at explaining every thought and emotion, and failed miserably." The Hindu wrote "The first scene is powerful and makes you sit up for a riveting story. Sadly the fizz dies down soon. More like ‘Mouna Ragam’ rehashed, ‘Vallamai Thaaraayo’ does have its high moments — but they are few and far between."

Box office
The film was a commercial failure.

References

External links
 

2008 films
2000s Tamil-language films
2008 romantic drama films
Films scored by Bharadwaj (composer)
2008 directorial debut films
Indian romantic drama films